Mansfield High School can refer to:

 Mansfield High School (Lancashire, England)
 Mansfield High School (Mansfield, Arkansas)
 Mansfield High School (Mansfield, Massachusetts)
 Mansfield High School (Mansfield, Pennsylvania)
 Mansfield High School (Mansfield, Texas)
 Mansfield Senior High School — Mansfield, Ohio